Moura is a common Portuguese surname. Notable people with the surname include: 

 Alan Casagrande de Moura, Italian-Brazilian footballer
 Ana Moura, Portuguese fado singer
 Ana Moura, Portuguese badminton player
 Ann Moura, American author
 Anthony Moura-Komenan, French-born Ivorian footballer
 Antônio de Moura Carvalho, Brazilian footballer
 Confúcio Moura, Brazilian politician
 Eduardo Souto de Moura, Portuguese architect
 Elaine Estrela Moura, Brazilian footballer
 Eleílson Farias de Moura, Brazilian footballer 
 Eli-Eri Moura, Brazilian composer
 Fábio Moura, Brazilian footballer
 Fernando Domingos de Moura, Brazilian footballer
 Francisco de Moura, 3rd Marquis of Castelo Rodrigo, Portuguese nobleman
 Francisco Serra e Moura, Portuguese footballer
 Geison Moura, Malaysian footballer
 Hugo Ventura Ferreira Moura Guedes, Portuguese footballer
 Infanta Ana de Jesus Maria of Portugal, Portuguese infanta
 José Barata-Moura, Portuguese philosopher
 José Moura Gonçalves, Brazilian physician, biomedical scientist, biochemist and educator
 José Vicente de Moura, Portuguese sports administrator
 Julio César de Andrade Moura, Brazilian footballer
 Júlio Soares de Moura Neto, Brazilian admiral
 Kerlon Moura Souza, Brazilian footballer 
 Roberto Landell de Moura, Brazilian Roman Catholic priest and inventor
 Leonardo Moura (disambiguation), many people
 Leonardo da Silva Moura, Brazilian footballer
 Leonardo David de Moura, Brazilian footballer
 Leonardo José Aparecido Moura, Brazilian footballer
 Lucas Rodrigues Moura da Silva, a footballer who joined Spurs in 2018
 Lucimar de Moura, Brazilian track and field athlete
 Manuel de Moura, 2nd Marquis of Castelo Rodrigo, Portuguese nobleman
 Margarida Moura, Portuguese tennis player
 Maria Lacerda de Moura, Brazilian anarcha-feminist
 Mayana Moura, Brazilian actress
 Mike Moura, Portuguese footballer
 Moisés Moura Pinheiro, Brazilian footballer
 Nuno José Severo de Mendoça Rolim de Moura Barreto, 1st Duke of Loulé, Portuguese nobleman
 Paulo de Moura, Portuguese handball coach
 Paulo Moura, Brazilian clarinetist and saxophonist
 Paula Moura (1996-), Brazilian drummer
 Rafael Moura, Brazilian footballer
 Robson Moura, Brazilian jujitsu competitor
 Romário Leiria de Moura, Brazilian footballer
 Severino Lima de Moura, Brazilian footballer
Timothy Moura, American professional wrestler
 Toninho Moura, Brazilian football manager
 Vasco Graça Moura, Portuguese politician
 Venâncio da Silva Moura, Angolan politician and diplomat
 Wagner Moura, Brazilian actor
 Wander Moura, Brazilian long-distance runner
 Weverson Leandro Oliveira Moura, Brazilian footballer
 Wilson Rodrigues de Moura Júnior, Brazilian footballer
 Saint Moura, Egyptian saint

See also

Portuguese-language surnames